Elena Ivanovna Perepelkina (born on January 24, 1982, Pushnoye, Leningrad) is a freestyle wrestler from Russia who participated in Women's freestyle wrestling 72 kg at 2008 Summer Olympics. She lost in 1/8 of final with Kyoko Hamaguchi from Japan

External links
 Athlete bio on beijing2008.com

Living people
1982 births
Russian female sport wrestlers
Olympic wrestlers of Russia
Wrestlers at the 2008 Summer Olympics
21st-century Russian women